Robert Lester Hulse (born 10 November 1946) is a Belizean former sports shooter. He competed in the 50 metre rifle, prone event at the 1968 Summer Olympics.

References

External links
 

1946 births
Living people
Belizean male sport shooters
Olympic shooters of British Honduras
Shooters at the 1968 Summer Olympics
People from Belize City